Çamlıbel is a village in the Gölyaka District of Düzce Province in Turkey. Its population is 327 (2022).

References

Villages in Gölyaka District